Bangladeshi cuisine is the national cuisine of Bangladesh. Bangladeshi cuisine has been shaped by the diverse history and river-line geography of Bangladesh. The country has a tropical monsoon climate. The staple of Bangladesh is rice and fish. The majority of Bangladeshi people are ethnic Bengali, who follow Bengali cuisine, with a minority of non-Bengalis with their own unique cuisine. Bangladeshi food has more meat, especially beef, compared to West Bengal.

History 
Bangladeshi cuisine has over time been largely influenced by the Mughlai cuisine left behind by the Mughal rulers. This has led Bangladeshi cuisine to include many rich aromatic dishes such as biriyani and korma that require the use of a large array of spices along with an great deal of ghee. Dhaka being the Mughal capital of the Bengal Subah (which includes the modern Bangladesh and the Indian states of West Bengal) was a major trading center in South Asia, so many culinary styles from around the world influenced the city's cuisine. After Dhaka became the capital of East Bengal, the Bangladeshi populace began to adopt the cuisine of the city with many unknown Persian, Turkish and Arabic-influenced dishes becoming popular.

The food used to be spiced with black pepper and chui jhal before the arrival of green chili from the Americas.

Bangaliketa (etiquette)
Bangladeshi people follow certain rules and regulations while eating. It includes warm hospitality and particular ways of serving as well. The culture also defines the way to invite people to weddings and for dinner. Gifts are given on certain occasions.  also includes presentation of serving utensils in a proper manner.

Culinary style and influences
Rice is the staple food of Bangladesh, while fish is the most common source of protein in Bangladesh. There are 250 plant-based ingredients in Bangladeshi cooking. The use of mustard oil is common.

Specialties by region

Dhaka 
Dhakaiya food is one of the most notable regional cuisines. The rich culinary customs are influenced by Mughlai, Central Asian, Armenian, Hindustani and native Bengali cuisines. However, it also has dishes unique to Dhaka. The Nawabs of Dhaka had brought Mughlai cuisine to Bengal, that were wholly retained by Dhaka's culinary community. Due to the high costs of producing Mughlai food, the recipes were limited to the elite classes in colonial India, and slowly expanded as Bangladesh's economy grew. The main focus on lamb, mutton, beef, yoghurt, and mild spices define the taste of the style. Such dishes as kebab; stuffed breads; kacchi biriyani; roast lamb, duck, and chicken; patisapta; Kashmiri tea; and korma are still served at special occasions like Eid and weddings. Due to the high class of the food, using an excess amount of expensive ingredients like ghee, and making the food melt in one's mouth were essential to the feel of the food.

 was one of the most famous business and social meeting centres of Dhaka in the Mughal period. During Ramadan  is famous for its Iftar items which include Moghul cuisine and other traditional items. Almost 500 different types of Iftar are prepared for Holy Ramadan. Dhakaiya paratha, a multi layered version, is popular in Dhaka and taken in Kolkata by refugees after the partition. 

 (also known as Hajir biriyani) is the Chevon biryani dish made with highly seasoned rice and goat's meat. The recipe includes highly seasoned rice, chevon, mustard oil, garlic, onion, black pepper, saffron, clove, cardamom, cinnamon, salt, lemon, doi (yogurt), peanuts, cream, raisin and small amount of cheese (either cow or buffalo). The recipe has been handed over the founder of the restaurant to his next generation.

, the traditional food/snack of the people of old Dhaka is famous for its quality and taste.  is mainly dished up with tea.

Morog pulao, is a special dish of chicken cooked with aromatic rice. This type of pulao is a signature dish of Dhakaiya cuisine.

Chittagong Division 
The Chittagong region is famous for spicy and hot curries – mainly of beef.  is very popular and famous.  is a Persian word literally meaning a host. The word now means 'community feasting', a tradition that originated in Dhaka region. Mezban (locally known as Mejjan) is the Bengali word for special occasion feasts in the Chittagong region of Bangladesh. Historically Mezbani is a traditional regional feast where people are invited to enjoy a meal with white rice and beef, besides other dishes rich in animal fat and dairy. It is held on the occasions such as death anniversary, birth anniversary, celebrating successes, launching of a new business, entry into a new house, the birth of a child, marriage, aqiqah and circumcision, ear piercing of girls and naming of the newborn. The invitation of the Mezban ceremony generally remains open for all and various people to different places and neighbourhoods convey the invitation for the feast. In urban areas, attending a mezban is by invitation only. Usually, the consumption of food at Mezbani takes place from morning to afternoon.

Beef-based dishes are preferred by Bengali Muslims and are a symbol of social prestige for a Mezban feast. The rich and the poor arrange feasts on various occasions as much as circumstances allow them. It has a distinct style of cooking and proper Mezban meat demands a certain skill; for example: The unique beef curry served in this feast is known as Mezbani gosht, that carries a distinctive recipe, knowledge of which is essentially confined within the Chittagonian cooks.

Fish is used instead of beef while cooking Mezban in Hindu tradition. The Hindu community of Chittagong organises Mezbani each year under the banner of "Chittagong Parishad", with curries made from fish, vegetable and dried fish.

Blackened Beef/kala bhuna is one of the famous beef recipe from the Chittagong in Bangladesh. The specialty of the recipe is its spices and the blacken beef. Beef shoulder pieces are cooked with traditional spices till become dark and tender.  and mejbani mangsho preparations are signature dishes of the port city Chittagong.

Among other dishes, durus kura or duroos is a popular chicken dish. A whole chicken is cooked in thick broth & then served with rice-based dishes like polao, khichuri. It also a part of Rohingya Cuisine.

Akhni, also commonly known as Orosher Biriyani is a biriyani variant made with chinigura rice (an aromatic, short-grained rice). It contains beef/chevon cut in small cubes, potatoes, raisins, dried apricots etc.

Chittagong being a coastal region is also known for its marine fish. Rupchanda (silver pomfret) fish and Loita (Bombay duck) fish are two of the most well known fish in the region. Loita is often sold and consumed as dry fish, shutki. Churi fish (Ribbon fish) is often consumed as dry fish cooked with chili and onions. Koral fish/bhetki (Barramundi) is a popular type of fish found in the Bay of Bengal and consumed in the coastal regions. Giant tiger prawn is also consumed in the coast regions of Bangladesh.

Chittagong Hill Tracts 
The Chittagong Hill Tracts are home to various non-Bengali tribes who have their own culture and cuisine. Chakma cuisine uses sidol, a paste made from fermented shrimps' and fish, and suguni, dry shrimp or fish, in their cooking. Their dishes use more fresh herbs from the hills than spices which are more common in Bengali dishes. The Marma cuisine uses a dry fish paste called nappi. Rice beer is popular drink.

Greater Mymensingh 
Mymensigh cuisine is different from rest of Bangladesh in its preference for spicy food. Muri (puffed rice) or Chira (flattened rice) is also used consumed with Doi.

 ,also known as Muktagachhar monda, is a traditional sweetmeat. The sweet, first made in 1824 by Gopal Pal in Muktagacha Upazila, is reputed in Bangladesh for its originality, taste and flavor. Gopal was originally from Murshidabad but moved to Rajshahi and from there to Muktagacha after the death of the Nawab Siraj ud-Daulah.

The Garo people are an ethnic and religious minority in Mymensingh region with their own unique culture and cuisine. Their cuisine is notable for the use of pork, eel, and turtle meat. Garo also produce home brewed liquor. Cooking using soda and in bamboo is a traditional practice.

Northern Bangladesh 
In Northern Bangladesh, there were numerous dairy farms which produced doi or yougurt. The farmers of the region made their doi with reduced milk which made it taste more like kheer compared to doi from other regions. Biral Upazila is well known for large Koi fish. koi fish paturi is where the fish is cooked in banana leaf.

In Bangladesh the most famous variation of Mishti Doi is in Bogra. Bogurar Doi was invented by Ghetu Ghosh of Sherpur in Bogra District and Gaur Gopal Ghosh invented the creamed version. The Gosh family continue to make the curd in Bogra District. Doi is also used to cook fish in Northern Bangladesh such as Catla fish.

The Rangpur region has a beef dish cooked with pumpkin.

Santal live in the Rajshahi region and are non-Bengali ethnic minority. They eat crab, pork, squirrel, and fish. Santals also use less spices in their cooking. They produce an alcoholic drink from rice called hadia. They also make liquor using palm tree resin which is also used for ritual ceremonies.

Southern Bangladesh 
People in Bangladesh's south-western districts like Khulna, Jessore, Bagerhat, Satkhira and Narail cut down the stem, roots, peel the skin and chop it into small pieces - and cook them with meat and fish, especially with mutton. It is a relatively expensive spice in Bangladesh, and the roots are usually more expensive than the stems because of their stronger aroma. The taste is similar to horseradish. It was use to make a dish hot before chili was imported from the Americas in the 16th century.

Barisal, a coastal region, uses coconut in cooking.

Sylhet Division 

Shatkora: In Bangladesh, the thick fleshy rind of the Citrus macroptera, known as shatkora, is eaten as a vegetable. It has a unique taste and aroma. The thick rind is cut into small pieces and cooked (either green or ripe) in beef, mutton, and fish curries. A beef shatkora dish cooked by local chefs in Sylhet, Bangladesh (where the  originates from) is featured in the British celebrity chef Rick Stein's cookery programme Rick Stein's Far Eastern Odyssey (Episode 6), which was broadcast by the BBC on 20 August 2009.

Seven-colour tea or seven-layer tea  is a well-known hot beverage in Bangladesh. Romesh Ram Gour invented the seven-layer tea after discovering that different tea leaves have different densities. Each layer contrasts in colour and distinct taste, from syrupy sweet to spicy cloves. The result is an alternating dark/light band pattern throughout the drink giving the tea its name.

Biroin Bhat is one type of glutinous rice popular in Sylhet region. There is a special type of red-and-white sticky aromatic Biroin Rice is found only in the Sylhet region. This aromatic biroin chaul is cooked and eaten with fried fish, meat or kebab, khirshah rasmalai, date molasses etc. Biroin Chal is an organic rice cultivated in the highland of Sylhet and Chottogram. It is the main ingredients for Chunga Pitha, a traditional rice cake in the Sylhet region.

Hutki,: Different types of fish curries is available in Sylheti cuisine. Fish is eaten both curry and fried. Dried and fermented fish called Hutki, and Hatkora, a bitter and fragrant citrus fruit are used for cooking curries. Even the extremely hot Naga Morich is used with broths. The most savored local cuisines include Hidol or fermented fish chutney, Hutki Shira or dried fish curry, and various freshwater fish indigenous to this region. It is thought by the locals that excessive spicy hotness of Hidol Chutney is a remedy for colds and headaches.

Bangladesh-British restaurants 
In the early 20th century sailors from Sylhet, known as Lascars, settled in England and from there spread to the rest of the country. The bought fish and chip restaurants and developed them into full service Indian restaurants. The cuisine was based on already established Anglo-Indian restaurants and Mughal Cuisine. The restaurants were initially identified as either Indian or Pakistani restaurants. There are 8000 "Indian restaurants" in Britain owned by Bangladeshis.

n the United Kingdom, more than 8 out of 10 Indian restaurants are owned by Bangladeshis, 95% of which come from Sylhet. Sylhet is not known for its cuisine, though 80% to 90% British curry-house trace their roots directly to Sylhet. Chefs from Sylhet region developed the British curry to a greater extent since the 1960s. Chicken tikka masala, invented by the Sylhetis is regarded as Britain's National dish since 2001, by Britain's foreign secretary Robin Cook. The birthday celebration of the British Prime Minister Tony Blair's daughter at a Bangladeshi restaurant proves the popularity of Sylheti cuisine. Historian Lizzie Collingham, in her 2005 book Curry: A Biography, coined that the Sylheti curry cooks converted “unadventurous British palates” to a new flavour spectrum.

Sweets

Amriti 
Amriti is a type of sweet made using deep fried flower soaked in sugary syrup. It is popular Dhaka and Tangail District.

Chomchom 
It is a very popular dessert in Bangladesh and India. The sweet is oval and brownish. Nirmol’s chomchom, sold at Nirmol Mistanno Bhandar established in 1953, is popular in Rajbari District.

Boondi 
Boondi is popular during Ramadan.

Balish Mishti 
Balish Mishti (lit. pillow sweet), called because of its pillow-like shape and huge size, has a history of almost hundred years in Natore District.

Jilapi 
Jilapi is pretzel typed fried item dipped in sugar syrup. Shahi jilapi is originally from Chowkbazar of Old Dhaka.

Kachagolla 
Kachagolla is a type of sweet from Natore District in the Rajshahi Division. According to legend this item was made by Modhusudan Das for Rani Bhabani. Though it is called  (means small ball in native Bengali languages) but it has no common shape like other sweetmeat items. It is made of raw (kahca) chhena or paneer (which is made by curdling the milk and separating the whey from it) and sugar.

Ledikeni 
Ledikeni is a type of sweet consumed in Bangladesh. It is a light fried reddish-brown sweet ball made of Chhena and flour, soaked in sugar syrup originating in the 19th century. Ledikeni is named after Lady Canning, the wife of Charles Canning, the Governor General of India during 1856–62.

Pantua 
Pantua is the Bengali version of gulab jamun.

Rasmalai 
Ras malai consists of sugary white cream, or yellow-coloured (flattened) balls of chhana soaked in malai (clotted cream) flavoured with cardamom.  of Comilla created by "Matree Bhandar" is the best and oldest in Bangladesh. It is very popular sweet all over the country.

Taal 
The fruit of Palmyra palm is called taal and it is used to make a variety of desserts. Taler malpua and laddu are popular items.

Beverages

Alcoholic 

 Hunter Beer is the only alcoholic beer produced in Bangladesh. It is manufactured by Jamuna Group. Alcohol sales remain tightly controlled with a government permit necessary for purchase.
 Carew is a government owned distillery company in Bangladesh. It is produced at Darshana Sugar Mill in Chuadanga District. It is owned by Bangladesh Sugar and Food Industries Corporation, a state owned corporation. 
 Non-Bengali tribes produce and consume alcohol from fermented rice.

Non-alcoholic 

 Borhani, is a traditional yogurt-like drink from Bangladesh. Borhani is made from sour doi, green chilli, mustard seeds, black salt, coriander and mint. It is normally drank after heavy meals such as biryani (Kacchhi) and polao and morog Polao  in order to aid digestion although appetizer borhanis do exist.
 Taal er rosh (Palm juice) is the sap extracted from palm trees and drank as a cool beverage in summer.
Rooh Afza is an is a concentrated squash made by Hamdard Bangladesh.
Ghol and matha are traditional buttermilk drinks made in Bangladesh. The village of Solop in Ullapara upazila of Sirajganj District is well known for making matha.
Lassi is a regional name for buttermilk, the traditional doi (yogurt)–based drink, consumed in Bangladesh. Lassi is a blend of yogurt, and spices.

See also 

 List of Bangladeshi dishes
 List of Bangladeshi sweets and desserts
 List of Bangladeshi spices
 Bengali cuisine
 Chaunk
 Panta bhat

Further reading
 Bangladeshi Restaurant Curries, Piatkus, London –  (1996)
 Curries – Masterchef Series, Orion, London –  (1996)
 Curry, Human & Rousseau, South Africa  –  (1993)
 Kerrie, in Afrikaans, Human & Rousseau, South Africa –  (1993)
 Petit Plats Curry, French edition, Hachette Marabout, Paris   –  (2000)
 2009 Cobra Good Curry Guide, John Blake Publishing, London – 
 Bangladesh – Mariam Whyte, Yong Jui Lin 
 World and Its Peoples: Eastern and Southern Asia – Marshall Cavendish Corporation – 
 Bangladesh – Stuart Butler 
 Bangladeshi Cuisine – Shawkat Osman
 Multicultural Handbook of Food, Nutrition and Dietetics

References

External links
 

 
 
South Asian cuisine
Bangladeshi
Bangladeshi culture
Industry in Bangladesh

es:Gastronomía de Bangladesh